Blodhemn (Norwegian meaning "blood revenge") is the fourth studio album by Norwegian heavy metal band Enslaved. It was released in 1998, through Osmose Productions.

Background 

The album was produced by Peter Tägtgren, and is the first Enslaved album recorded and produced at his Abyss studio, alongside the follow-up.  Allmusic says that Blodhemn is Enslaved's  "blackest" album, and a step forward in songwriting, due to its shorter, cleaner songs and compressed sound. Allmusic also describes the song structure as having rock and roll elements in the songs "Urtical Gods" and "Nidingaslakt".

Track listing

Personnel 
 Enslaved

 Ivar Bjørnson – guitar, keyboards
 Grutle Kjellson – bass guitar, vocals
 Richard Kronheim – guitar
 Dirge Rep (Per Husebø) – drums

References 

Enslaved (band) albums
1998 albums
Season of Mist albums
Osmose Productions albums
Albums produced by Peter Tägtgren